Chalte Chalte is a 1976 Indian Hindi-language musical romantic thriller film directed by Sunder Dar and produced by Bhisham Kohli. It stars Vishal Anand (Bhisham Kohli's screen name) and Simi Garewal in pivotal roles. The film was noted for its songs by Bappi Lahiri, and title song, "Chalte Chalte" sung by Kishore Kumar was part of the Binaca Geetmala annual list 1976. It was a superhit at the box office.

Plot

Geeta and a young man are in love and want to marry. Unfortunately the young man tragically dies, leaving behind a devastated and shocked Geeta, who eventually loses her senses and is confined to a mental hospital. Years later, Geeta recovers and is discharged, only to find that the man she thought was dead is still alive, calls himself Ravi, and is in love with a lovely young woman named Asha. Unable to deal with this, Geeta decides to make Ravi her own. When she fails, she is re-confined in the mental hospital. Ravi decides to travel abroad, leaving Asha alone. It is then Geeta escapes, gains entry into the house, and tries to do away with Asha, who she believes is the real cause of why her lover has lost interest in her. Geeta tries to kill Asha but is ultimately killed by falling off the roof. 
The film ends with Ravi consoling Asha. The background music 'Chalte Chalte' plays.

Cast
 Vishal Anand...Ravi Kapoor
 Simi Garewal...Geeta
 Nazneen...Asha
 Shreeram Lagoo...Dr. Roy
 Jagdish Raj...Inspector 
 Jankidas...Dr. Jankidas
 Ratan Gaurang...Bahadur

Soundtrack
All songs of the film have been written by Amit Khanna.

References

External links

1970s Hindi-language films
1976 films
Films scored by Bappi Lahiri
1970s romantic thriller films
Indian romantic thriller films